Exalphus confusus is a species of beetle in the family Cerambycidae. Along with Exalphus spilonotus and four other beetles of the genus, the beetle was discovered in Brazil as a means to further describe the beetles of the genus in a study headed by the Universidad Federal de Paraná in 2001.

References

Acanthoderini
Beetles described in 2001